Miles Conway Moore (April 17, 1845 – December 18, 1919) was an American politician who served as the 14th and last Territorial Governor of Washington Territory. He served seven months in office as governor, his two-year term ending prematurely when Washington attained statehood in November 1889.

Biography
Born in 1845, in Rix Mills, Ohio, Moore moved to Wisconsin with his parents in 1857 and attended the Bronson Institute in Point Bluff, Wisconsin.

Career
In 1863, Moore moved to Blackfoot, Montana and then to Walla Walla, Washington.  Arriving penniless, he took a job as a clerk in a general store. In 1869, he partnered with H. E. Johnson and Company to form Paine Brothers and Moore, where he worked until 1877 as a dealer of general merchandise and farm supplies. He married Mary Elizabeth "Molly" Baker on March 26, 1873, and the couple had three sons, Frank Allen, Walter Baker, and Robert L.

Moore served two terms as a member of the Walla Walla City Council, 1877 and 1878. He was elected to the office of Mayor of Walla Walla in 1877.

In March 1889, Moore was appointed by President Benjamin Harrison as the final Governor of Washington Territory. Taking office in April 1889, he dealt with major fire disasters in Seattle, Spokane, and Ellensburg while preparing for the transition from territory to statehood on November 11, 1889.

Moore served as vice-president and president of the Baker-Boyer National Bank, and three years on the executive council of the American Bankers Association. In 1913, he was elected president of the board of overseers for Whitman College in Walla Walla.

Death
Moore died December 18, 1919, in Walla Walla and is interred at Mountain View Cemetery, Walla Walla, Washington.

References

Further reading
Available online through the Washington State Library's Classics in Washington History collection

External links

1845 births
1919 deaths
19th-century American politicians
American Bankers Association
Governors of Washington Territory